Divorce is the legal ending of a marriage. 

Divorce may also refer to:

Film
 Divorce (1923 film), a silent drama starring Jane Novak
Divorce (1945 film), a drama starring Kay Francis and Bruce Cabot
Divorced (1943 film), a Mexican film
Divorced (1951 film), a Swedish film
A Divorce, a 1953 Mexican film
The Divorce (1970 film), a comedy starring Vittorio Gassman and Anita Ekberg
Le Divorce, a 2003 film by James Ivory
Divorce (2023 film), a Malayalam film

Literature
Divorce (novel), a 1943 Chinese novel by Lao She
At-Talaq or "Divorce", the 65th sura of the Qur'an

Music
The Divorce, a rock band based in Seattle, Washington, United States
"D-I-V-O-R-C-E", a song by Tammy Wynette 
D-I-V-O-R-C-E (album), an album by Tammy Wynette
"D.I.V.O.R.C.E.", a song by Billy Connolly

Television
The Divorce (TV series), a 2015 Australian television series
 Divorce (TV series), a 2016 HBO TV series

See also

Divorcee (disambiguation)
Dvorce (disambiguation)